Phenax may refer to:
 Phenax, a genus of true bugs in the family Fulgoridae
 Phenax, a genus of plants in the family Urticaceae